Peter Abir Antonisamy (07 April 1952, Sathipattu, Cuddalore District, Tamil Nadu, India) is an Indian prelate of the Roman Catholic Church. He is the bishop of Roman Catholic Diocese of Sultanpet.

Early life 
He was born in Sathipattu, Cuddalore District, Tamil Nadu, India on 07 April 1952.

Priesthood & Education 
He was ordained a priest on 1 May 1979. He holds a master's degree in biblical theology from St. Peter's Pontifical Seminary, a master's degree in literature and history from the University of Titrupathy, India, a licentiate in sacred scriptures from the Pontifical Biblical Institute in Rome, and a doctorate in sacred scriptures from the Pontifical Gregorian University, Rome.

Episcopate 
He was appointed bishop of Sultanpet by Pope Francis on 28 December 2013. He was consecrated on 16 February 2014 with Archbishop Salvatore Pennacchio as principle consecrator. Archbishop Francis Kallarakal and Bishop Thomas Aquinas Lephonse acted as co-consecrators. His episcopal motto is broken to build.

On 27 January 2021, Pope Francis appointed Bishop Peter Abir as Apostolic Administrator of the Archdiocese of Pondicherry and Cuddalore upon the resignation of its Archbishop Antony Anandarayar. His office as Apostolic Administrator ceased by the appointment of Bishop Francis Kalist as Archbishop of Pondicherry on 19 March 2022.

Experience
After ordination he held the following positions:
 1979-1981: Assistant parish to Athipakkam;
 1981-1983: Studies at St. Peter's Pontifical Institute, Bangalore;
 1983-1984: Secretary of the Archbishop and Chancellor of the Curia;
 1984-1986: Professor of Sacred Scripture at the Good Shepherd Seminary, Coimbatore;
 1986-1987: Priest in Kurumbagaram;
 1987-1990: Director of the St. Paul's Bible Institute, Poonamelle;
 1990-1996: Studies in Rome, residing at the Pontifical College of St. Peter the Apostle;
 1996-2004: Director of the St. Paul's Bible Institute, Poonamelle;
 2002-2004: Deputy secretary of the Tamil Nadu Bishops' Council;
 2002-2008: Coordinator for South Asia of the Catholic Biblical Federation;
 2004-2010: Director of the Tamil Nadu Biblical, Catechetical and Liturgical Centre;
 Since 2010: Director Emmaus Spirituality Centre, Sithanagur, which he founded in 2004.
 Since Feb 2021: Apostolic Administrator of the Archdiocese of Pondicherry-Cuddalore

References

 
 

 

1951 births
21st-century Roman Catholic bishops in India
Living people